The 1983 season was the third in the history of Wollongong City (now Wollongong Wolves). It was also the third season in the National Soccer League. In addition to the domestic league, they also participated in the NSL Cup. Wollongong City finished 15th in their National Soccer League season, and were eliminated in the NSL Cup first round by Canberra City.

Players

Overview

National Soccer League

League table

Results by round

Matches

NSL Cup

Statistics

Appearances and goals
Players with no appearances not included in the list.

Clean sheets

References

Wollongong Wolves FC seasons